Miguel Frank (March 27, 1920 - August 9, 1994) was a Chilean writer, dramatist and lawyer.

Theater career
Later he devoted himself to the theater in which he created and directed highly successful works like "Waltz Time" (1950), "The Terrible Carolina" (1954) and "The Man of the Century" (1946) which was translated into English and published by Southern Illinois University Press in 1970.

Chilean male dramatists and playwrights
Chilean film directors
Chilean theatre directors
1920 births
1994 deaths
People from Santiago
20th-century Chilean dramatists and playwrights
20th-century Chilean male writers
20th-century Chilean lawyers